The EL/W-2085 is an airborne early warning and control (AEW&C) multi-band radar system developed by Israel Aerospace Industries (IAI) and Elta Electronics Industries of Israel. Its primary objective is to provide intelligence to maintain air superiority and conduct surveillance. The system is currently in-service with Israel, Italy, and Singapore, and in the future, the United States.

Design and features

The EL/W-2085 was developed from the single-band EL/M-2075 "Phalcon" system.

Instead of using a rotodome, a moving radar found on some AEW&C aircraft, the EL/W-2085 uses an active electronically scanned array (AESA) – an active phased array radar. This radar consists of an array of transmit/receive (T/R) modules that allow a beam to be electronically steered, making a physically rotating rotodome unnecessary. AESA radars operate on a pseudorandom set of frequencies and also have very short scanning rates, which makes them difficult to detect and jam.  Up to 1000 targets can be tracked simultaneously to a range of 243 nmi (450 km), while at the same time, multitudes of air-to-air interceptions or air-to-surface (includes maritime) attacks can be guided simultaneously. The radar equipment of the Israeli CAEW consists of each one L-band radar left and right sides on the fuselage and each one S-band antenna in nose and tail. The phased array allows positions of aircraft on operator screens to be updated every 2–4 seconds, rather than every 10 seconds as is the case on the rotodome AWACS.

Operational history
Circa 2005 the Israeli Air Force purchased five Gulfstream G550-based Eitam aircraft to serve as the new IDF platform for its newer generation of AEW systems. The new aircraft use the EL/W-2085 dual-band sensor suite, and are more capable and less expensive to operate than the older Boeing 707-based EL/M-2075. Extensive modifications were made to the Gulfstream's fuselage by IAI, such as the addition of protruding composite radomes, to house the radar arrays in conformal body modifications. Based at Nevatim Airbase.

In 2007, four similar G550-EL/W-2085 aircraft were purchased by the Republic of Singapore Air Force to replace its upgraded E-2C Hawkeyes. The new G550 aircraft entered service on 13 April 2012.

Italy purchased two G550-EL/W-2085 aircraft in 2011 and ordered two more in 2022.

Operators

Israeli Air Force

Italian Air Force

Singapore Air Force

United States Navy

Royal Moroccan Air Force

See also

References

External links

 EL/W-2085 Archives The Aviationist article on CAEW
  EL/W-2085 official brochure
  official product page

Aircraft radars
Military radars of Israel
Elta products